Centaurea drabifolioides, the whitlow-grass-leaved centaury, is a species of flowering plant in the  Asteraceae family.

Distribution 
Its natural range is Turkey.

Taxonomy 
It was named by Arthur Huber-Morath, in Bauhinia 3: 322, t. 29. in 1967.

References 

drabifolioides
Critically endangered plants
Critically endangered flora of Asia
Critically endangered biota of Europe